Chaudhary Darshan Lal is an Indian politician from the state of Punjab. Lal represents the Balachaur Assembly constituency of Punjab and is a member of the Punjab Legislative Assembly (2017–2022).

Family 

The son of Ram Chand, he was born 6 April 1950 in the village of Mangupur, Shaheed Bhagat Singh Nagar district, Punjab.
He has three sons 
Billa Chaudhary, 
Ajay Kumar Mangupur,
Sethi Chaudhary.
Business = Chaudhary Darshan Lal is a contractor and businessman.

Political career 

He contested as a candidate of Peoples Party of Punjab in the Assembly election 2012 from  constituency Balachaur and got approximately 19000 votes. He contested the same election in only 20 days and got the votes nearest to the votes got by the candidate of the both National parties INC (20904 votes) and BSP (21943 votes). He is also a social worker  from last 35 years.  There is not a single black spot on his services as Sarpanch, Block Samiti Member, Member of Market Committee and Chairman of Zila Parishad Nawashahar (Now SBS Nagar).
He served as sarpanch of village Mangupur for two terms i.e. 10 years (1992-2002).

2. He served  block Saroya as Samiti Member for 5 years (1992-1997).

3. He served Constituency Balachaur as Market Committee Member for 5 years (1997-2002).

4. He served District Shaheed Bhagat Singh Nagar as Zila Parishad Chairman for 5 years.

5. He contested the Member of Legislative Assembly election from  Constituency Balachaur.

6. He is  Executive Member of Punjab Pradesh Congress Committee.

References 

Year of birth missing (living people)
Living people
Legislative Assembly
Punjab
Indian National Congress politicians